Adam Dorrel (born December 2, 1974) is an American football coach and former player. He is the current head coach of the Central Oklahoma Bronchos football team in Edmond, Oklahoma, a position he will begin in 2022. Previously Dorrel was the head coach at Northwest Missouri State in Maryville, Missouri from 2011 to 2016, and Abilene Christian in Abilene, Texas, from 2017 to 2021. While at Northwest Missouri State he led the program to three undefeated seasons and the NCAA Division II Football Championship in 2013, 2015, and 2016.

Early life, family, and playing career
Dorrel is to date the only Maryville native to coach Northwest Missouri State. He graduated from Maryville High School, where he was a two-time All-Midland Empire Conference and all-district lineman. In 1992 Dorrel was named as an all-state offensive lineman.  Dorrel's great-grandfather was a fullback on Northwest's first team in 1908, and his grandfather and two great-uncles played for the team in the 1940s.

Dorrel played under Northwest's Mel Tjeerdsma during Tjeerdsma's first Northwest season in 1994 in which the Bearcats went 0–11 before Tjeerdsma began his run of seven NCAA Division II Football Championship games. He was captain of the team under Tjeerdsma in 1995, 1996 and 1997.  He was Daktronics Second-Team All-America offensive lineman as a senior in 1997 (with Bearcats reaching the quarterfinals in both 1996 and 1997).

Coaching career
After graduating from Northwest in 1998 he was a graduate assistant in 1998 at Northeastern State University in Oklahoma.  He returned to Northwest as a graduate assistant in 1999 when Bearcats won their second national championship in 1999.  He received his master's degree from Northwest in 2000.  He held a position as offensive line coach at Dakota State University in 2000 and offensive coach at William Jewell College from 2001 to 2003.

In 2004, he returned to Northwest and held offensive positions as the team made five consecutive national championship appearances in 2005-2009 including a national championship in 2009 (a year in which the Bearcats averaged 42 points and 474 yards per game).

In 2007, he was named offensive coach of the United States national American football team for the 2007 IFAF World Cup (which the United States won).

Before the 2011 season, Tjeerdsma retired and Scott Bostwick who had been the defensive coach at Northwest was named to succeed Tjeerdsma. Dorrel was promoted to assistant coach and had planned to continue his offensive duties. Bostwick died of a heart attack on June 5, 2011. On June 23 Dorrel was named head coach.  Both Bostwick and Dorrel had started affiliations with Northwest under Tjeerdsma in the first 0–11 1994 season and both coaches did not have prior head coaching positions before taking over the head coach position. The Maryville Daily Forum in applauding the appointment noted that Northwest had wanted to hire somebody familiar with the Tjeerdsma tradition rather than going outside.

After winning the 2016 Division II Championship, Dorrel announced he will be leaving the Bearcats to become head coach at Abilene Christian University. 

Following a 5-6 campaign in the 2021 season, Abilene Christian relieved Dorrel of his coaching duties. Dorrel ended with an overall record of 19-32 at Abilene Christian.

On December 5, 2021 Dorrel became the head coach of the Central Oklahoma Bronchos football program.

Head coaching record

References

External links
 Central Oklahoma profile
 Abilene Christian profile
 Northwest Missouri State profile

1974 births
Living people
Abilene Christian Wildcats football coaches
Central Oklahoma Bronchos football coaches
Dakota State Trojans football coaches
Northeastern State RiverHawks football coaches
Northwest Missouri State Bearcats football coaches
Northwest Missouri State Bearcats football players
William Jewell Cardinals football coaches
People from Maryville, Missouri
Coaches of American football from Missouri
Players of American football from Missouri